Cheah Cheng Hye (born 18 March 1954) is a fund manager and the Co-Chairman and Co-CIO of Value Partners, a Hong Kong-based listed asset management company with a Greater China focus. In 2010, it was the second biggest private fund managing company in the continent.  Currently, Cheah and his team manage the flagship equity Classic Fund and other funds of the Group.

Cheah has served as an Independent Non-executive Director of Hong Kong Exchanges and Clearing (“HKEX”) since April 2017. From 2015 to 2018, Cheah was an appointed member of the Financial Services Development Council (FSDC), following a two-year term as a member of the New Business Committee of FSDC since 2013. He is also a member of the Hong Kong University of Science and Technology (HKUST) Business School Advisory Council, a member of the Hong Kong Trade Development Council Belt and Road & Greater Bay Area Committee, a Fellow of the Hong Kong Management Association and a member of the Hong Kong Academy of Finance (“MAoF”).

In August 2016, Cheah was conferred Darjah Gemilang Pangkuan Negeri (DGPN), one of the highest civil honours granted by the state of Penang, Malaysia.  Dato’ Seri CHEAH is Convenor of Advisory Council  and a founding member of the Malaysian Chamber of Commerce (Hong Kong and Macau).

Early life and career 

Born into an ethnic Chinese family in Penang, Malaysia in 1954, Cheah attended the Penang Free School.  After graduation, he joined The Star (Malaysia) newspaper as subeditor and editorial writer. In 1974, he travelled from Malaysia to Hong Kong and later became a financial journalist with the Hong Kong Standard, the Asian Wall Street Journal and the Far Eastern Economic Review.

In 1989, Cheah became head of research and proprietary trader at UK-based brokerage Morgan, Grenfell & Co. In 1993, Cheah and V-Nee Yeh co-founded Value Partners and started its first investment fund – Value Partners Classic Fund.  In 2007, Value Partners became the first value-investing fund management company listed on the Hong Kong Stock Exchange (Stock code: 806 HK).

Proponent of value investing 

Cheah is a proponent of value investing.
While Cheah has been influenced by the value-investing idea that was developed by Columbia Business School professors Benjamin Graham and David Dodd in their text Security Analysis, he adopted the method for Asian markets. In 2010, he was invited by the Heilbrunn Center for Graham and Doddd Investing of the Columbia Business School to give a keynote speech, titled "Value-investing: Making it work in China and Asia", at the annual Graham & Dodd Breakfast.

Recognition 

2021: Named by Asia Asset Management as one of the Top 25 Leaders over the past 25 years in Asia’s asset management industry.
2018: Value Partners Group was named on Forbes Asia’s "Best Under A Billion". The company’s Chairman and co-founder, Cheah Cheng Hye, talks about how he has grown his business to become one of the region’s top-performing public companies.
2018: Received the "Outstanding figure of Hong Kong Stock Connect" award from Mainland China's Securities Times 证券时报 - a leading financial and securities newspaper ran by the People's Daily.
2017: Appointed as an Independent Non-executive Director of Hong Kong Exchanges and Clearing Limited (“HKEX”).
2016: Conferred Darjah Gemilang Pangkuan Negeri (DGPN) that carries the title “Dato’ Seri" by the government of Penang, Malaysia
2015: Appointed as a member of the Financial services Development Council (FSDC) by the Hong Kong Special Administrative Region Government
2013: Conferred the Darjah Setia Pangkuan Negeri (DSPN) that carries the title "Dato’ " by the government of Penang, Malaysia
2013: Appointed as a member of the New Business Committee of the Financial services Development Council (FSDC)
2013: Received an Honorary Fellowship from the Hong Kong University of Science and Technology for his contribution to the university and society
2011: Awarded "Best of the Best Region Awards - CIO of the Year in Asia" by Asia Asset Management 
2009-2010: Named in the top "25 Most Influential People in Asian Hedge Funds" by AsianInvestors

Cheah has also been given nicknames by the Chinese media including "Goldfinger" ( and "the Warren Buffett of Asia".

References

Further reading 
 The Value Investors: Lessons from the World’s Top Fund Managers, Ronald Chan, Wiley; 1st edition (11 September 2012), 

Living people
Hong Kong financial businesspeople
1954 births
People from Penang
Malaysian emigrants to Hong Kong